Bangladesh competed in the 2010 Commonwealth Games that were held in Delhi.

Medalists

Bangladesh's Commonwealth Games Team 2010

Aquatics

Diving

Swimming

Men's

Women's
 Mahfuza Khatun

Archery

Men's

Women's

Athletics

Men's

Boxing

Men's

Shooting

Men's

Women's

Squash

Weightlifting

See also
Bangladesh at the 2006 Commonwealth Games

References

2010
Nations at the 2010 Commonwealth Games
Commonwealth Games